The 2011 Quaker State 400 was a NASCAR Sprint Cup Series stock car race held on July 9, 2011 at Kentucky Speedway in Sparta, Kentucky. Contested over 267 laps on the 1.5-mile (2.4 km) asphalt tri-oval, it was 18th race of the 2011 Sprint Cup Series season, and the first Sprint Cup Series event at Kentucky Speedway.  The race was won by Kyle Busch for the Joe Gibbs Racing team. David Reutimann finished second, and Jimmie Johnson clinched third.

Report

Background 

Kentucky Speedway is one of ten intermediate tracks to hold NASCAR races. The track's turns are banked at 14 degrees, while the front stretch, the location of the finish line, is 8 degrees. The back stretch, opposite of the front, is at only 4 degrees. The racetrack has seats for 107,000 spectators. The track is also the most recent addition to the schedule since the 2001 season, when Chicagoland Speedway and Kansas Speedway were added to the schedule.

Before the race, Kevin Harvick led the Drivers' Championship with 586 points, and Carl Edwards stood in second with 581. Kyle Busch was third in the Drivers' Championship with 576 points, six ahead of Kurt Busch and twelve ahead of Matt Kenseth in fourth and fifth. Jimmie Johnson with 564 was 30 ahead of Dale Earnhardt Jr., as Jeff Gordon with 519 points, was 14 ahead of Clint Bowyer, and 21 in front of Ryan Newman. In the Manufacturers' Championship, Chevrolet was leading with 112 points, 10 ahead of Ford. Toyota, with 90 points, was 20 points ahead of Dodge in the battle for third.

Practice and qualifying

Four practice sessions were scheduled to be held before the Saturday race—two on both Thursday and Friday. The first session lasted 240 minutes, while the second session was 120 minutes long. The third session was scheduled to be 60 minutes, but was cancelled because of race, while the fourth was 90 minutes. Thursday's sessions was also used to test fuel injection, which the Sprint Cup Series will switch to for the 2012 season. Johnson was quickest with a time of 30.703 seconds in the first session, five-hundredths of a second faster than Paul Menard. Travis Kvapil was about one-tenth of a second slowing than Menard's pace, followed by Kyle Busch, Greg Biffle, and David Ragan. Gordon was seventh, still within a second of Johnson's time.

In the second practice session, Kyle Busch was fastest with a time of 30.193 seconds, only 0.155 of a second quicker than second-placed Kurt Busch. Edwards took third place, ahead of Menard, Newman and Johnson. Mark Martin only managed 7th place. During both sessions, four drivers were added to the session for the fuel injection testing, one for each manufacturer.  Of the four manufacturer and drivers, Ricky Stenhouse Jr. was quickest in both sessions for Roush Fenway Racing and Ford. The third practice session, the first practice only for the race and qualifying, was cancelled because of wet weather. Kyle Busch was quickest during final practice with a time of 29.540 seconds. Juan Pablo Montoya following in second, ahead of Kurt Busch, Kasey Kahne, and Johnson.

Forty-eight cars were entered for qualifying, but only forty-three raced because of NASCAR's qualifying procedure. However, after half of the cars qualified, wet weather soaked the track, therefore cancelling the session and making final practice times determine the qualifying grid. Kyle Busch, after finishing the final practice in first, won the pole position for Joe Gibbs Racing He was joined on the front row of the grid by Montoya. Kurt Busch was third, Kahne took fourth, and Johnson started fifth. Brad Keselowski, Edwards, Ragan, Tony Stewart, and Menard rounded out the first ten positions. The five drivers who failed to qualify for the race were David Stremme, Michael Waltrip, T. J. Bell, David Starr and Robby Gordon.

Traffic issues
To a large extent, the race was overshadowed by major traffic issues in the vicinity of the track.  Owner Speedway Motorsports had more than doubled track capacity to 107,000, but did not make any other significant upgrades to the infrastructure in and around the track in order to accommodate the sheer number of fans attending the race.  According to Sports Illustrated NASCAR writer Brant James,

Backups on Interstate 71 began more than eight hours before the start of the race. The KSP added that traffic was still backed up for miles at about 8:55 pm, halfway through the race. Some fans were reported to have parked their cars on the highway and leave them to catch a glimpse at the race. Others would try back roads, with some taking Kentucky Route 35, with more successful results at getting into the track. At 9:30 pm, traffic patterns were switched to outbound, and many fans who were still trying to get to the track were turned away. Several fans who managed to make it to the race were turned away because there wasn't enough available parking. Those who made it to the race were only reported having to wait half an hour or more to use the restroom due to a shortage of port-a-johns. Others reported shortages at the concession stands.

Bruton Smith, CEO of Speedway Motorsports, had joked on the day before the race that "we expect everyone to be home by Tuesday." Smith was in a much less cheerful mood during the race, telling reporters:

Also stuck in the jam was Denny Hamlin, who live-tweeted updates on his status while waiting to enter the track. Hamlin would, however, make the prerace drivers' meeting and start the race.

ESPN.com NASCAR writer Terry Blount commented after the race,

On the Monday after the race, the track announced that unscanned tickets for the Quaker State 400 would be valid for any of the remaining six 2011 Sprint Cup races to be held at tracks owned by Speedway Motorsports, or for the 2012 Kentucky Sprint Cup race. In addition to the ticket exchange, fans with unscanned tickets would also receive an equal number of tickets to either of the two remaining major events at the track in 2011—the Kentucky 225 in the Camping World Truck Series on October 1, or the Kentucky Indy 300 in the IndyCar Series on October 2.

Race
The race, the 18th in the season, began at 7:30 pm EDT and was televised live in the United States on TNT. Raceway Ministries pastor John Roberts began pre-race ceremonies, by giving the invocation. Next, Nick Lachey performed the national anthem, and Steve Beshear, Kentucky's Governor, gave the command for drivers to start their engines. Two drivers had to start at the end of the grid because of changes that were not approved during practice; they were Hamlin and Dave Blaney.

Results

Qualifying

Race results

Standings after the race

Drivers' Championship standings

Manufacturers' Championship standings

Note: Only the top five positions are included for the driver standings.

References

Quaker State 400
Quaker State 400
2011 Quaker State 400
Quaker State 400
NASCAR controversies